Wyckoff is a township in Bergen County, in the U.S. state of New Jersey. As of the 2020 United States census, the township's population was 16,585, a decrease of 111 (−0.7%) from the 2010 census count of 16,696, which in turn reflected an increase of 188 (+1.1%) from the 16,508 counted in the 2000 census. 

As of the 2010 census, Wyckoff ranked 55th in highest-household income places in the United States with a population of at least 10,000 at $103,614. Statewide, Wyckoff ranked 41st among New Jersey locations by per capita income, with a per capita money income of $49,375 as of 1999, an increase of 49.1% from the $33,124 recorded in 1989.

From the mid-18th century, what is now Wyckoff was a community within Franklin Township, formed on June 1, 1797, when Saddle River Township (now Saddle Brook) was split, which consisted of most of northern Bergen County west of the Saddle River. Starting in the 1840s, several new municipalities were created from portions of Franklin Township (Pompton Township on April 10, 1797, Hohokus Township (now Mahwah) on April 9, 1849, and Ridgewood Township on March 30, 1876; remaining now the Village of Ridgewood), so that today what is now Wyckoff borders eight different communities. Wyckoff was formed as a township by an act of the New Jersey Legislature on November 2, 1926, replacing Franklin Township, based on the results of a referendum held that day. Portions of Wyckoff were ceded to Midland Park based on the results of a referendum held on June 9, 1931.

However, similarly named Wyckoff Heights in New York City is named after the Wyckoff family, who settled in the New York/New Jersey area when both states were part of the Dutch colony of New Netherlands. Other sources ascribe the name to Wicaugh in Malpas, England.

History
The first known human inhabitants of the area were the Lenni Lenape Native Americans who lived north of the Raritan River and spoke a Munsee dialect of Algonquian. Sicomac, said to mean "resting place for the departed" or "happy hunting ground", is an area of Wyckoff that, according to tradition, was the burial place of many Native Americans, including Chief Oratam of the Ackingshacys, and many stores and buildings in the community have been named after the area's name, including Sicomac Elementary School. Most Native Americans had left by the 19th century, although a small group lived near Clinton Avenue until 1939.

What is Wyckoff today was originally part of Saddle River Township, which included all of Bergen County west of the Saddle River. Saddle River Township was split in 1771, with the area containing Wyckoff becoming Franklin Township. By 1755, about 100 families lived in the Franklin Township area, of which no more than 20 were in what is now Wyckoff. Franklin Township (1771) consisted of what is today Ho-Ho-Kus (seceded 1849), Ridgewood (seceded 1876), Midland Park (seceded 1894), Oakland (seceded 1902), Franklin Lakes (seceded 1922), and Wyckoff. The size of Franklin Township decreased as areas seceded and were incorporated into their own municipalities. After Franklin Lakes was established in 1922, Franklin Township consisted of only the area known locally as Wyckoff. On November 2, 1926, residents voted (243 positive votes out of 337) to change the name from Franklin Township to the Township of Wyckoff.

The first recorded permanent settlers were John and William Van Voor Haze (Voorhees), who purchased  of land in the area in 1720. Other early settlers (mostly Dutch) included the Van Horns, Terhunes, Ackermans, Quackenbushes, Pulises, and Vanderhoffs. In 1940 the population was just under 4,000 consisting of roughly 100 families with 30% of the land devoted to farming. By 1969 the number of farms had dropped to 13 covering , 6% of the township. By 2012, only two farms remain: Abma's Farm and Goffle Road Poultry Farm, which is Bergen County's only remaining live market. Rail service by the New Jersey Midland Railway began in 1870. That service was purchased by the New York, Susquehanna and Western Railway, which abruptly ended passenger service in 1966.

The Terhune House is an historic home listed on the National Register of Historic Places, located at 161 Godwin Avenue, that was initially constructed in 1737.

In 1994, the Vander Plaat funeral home prepared the body of Richard Nixon for burial.

Geography
According to the U.S. Census Bureau, the township had a total area of 6.65 square miles (17.22 km2), including 6.59 square miles (17.07 km2) of land and 0.06 square miles (0.15 km2) of water (0.89%). 

Unincorporated communities, localities and place names located partially or completely within the township include Sicomac.

The township borders the municipalities of Allendale, Franklin Lakes, Mahwah, Midland Park, Ridgewood and Waldwick in Bergen County; and both Hawthorne and North Haledon in Passaic County.

Climate
The climate in this area is characterized by hot, humid summers and generally mild to cool winters.  According to the Köppen Climate Classification system, Wyckoff has a humid subtropical climate, abbreviated "Cfa" on climate maps.

Demographics

2010 census

The Census Bureau's 2006–2010 American Community Survey showed that (in 2010 inflation-adjusted dollars) median household income was $145,366 (with a margin of error of +/− $11,501) and the median family income was $163,034 (+/− $10,963). Males had a median income of $111,950 (+/− $12,210) versus $64,148 (+/− $10,102) for females. The per capita income for the township was $64,476 (+/− $5,019). About 0.6% of families and 2.1% of the population were below the poverty line, including 0.9% of those under age 18 and 2.4% of those age 65 or over.

In 2010, the median income for a household in the township was $138,373, and the median income for a family was $154,420. In 2000, males had a median income of $87,850 versus $51,929 for females. The per capita income for the township was $49,375. About 1.1% of families and 1.8% of the population were below the poverty line, including 1.3% of those under age 18 and 1.9% of those age 65 or over.

Same-sex couples headed 24 households in 2010, an increase from the 17 counted in 2000.

2000 census
As of the 2000 U.S. census, there were 16,508 people, 5,541 households, and 4,632 families residing in the township. The population density was 2,521.6 people per square mile (973.1/km2). There were 5,638 housing units at an average density of 861.2 per square mile (332.3/km2). The racial makeup of the township was 94.54% White, 0.47% African American, 0.15% Native American, 3.70% Asian, 0.01% Pacific Islander, 0.45% from other races, and 0.68% from two or more races. Hispanic or Latino of any race were 2.28% of the population.

There were 5,541 households, out of which 42.4% had children under the age of 18 living with them, 75.7% were married couples living together, 5.8% had a female householder with no husband present, and 16.4% were non-families. 14.8% of all households were made up of individuals, and 8.9% had someone living alone who was 65 years of age or older. The average household size was 2.89 and the average family size was 3.22.

In the township, the population was spread out, with 28.3% under the age of 18, 4.3% from 18 to 24, 25.4% from 25 to 44, 26.2% from 45 to 64, and 15.8% who were 65 years of age or older. The median age was 41 years. For every 100 females, there were 91.3 males. For every 100 females age 18 and over, there were 87.5 males.

Government

Local government
Wyckoff is governed under the Township form of New Jersey municipal government, one of 141 municipalities (of the 564) statewide that use this form, the second-most commonly used form of government in the state. The Township Committee is comprised of five members, who are elected on a partisan basis as part of the November general election, with either one or two seats up for vote each year in a three-year cycle. At an annual reorganization meeting, the Township Committee selects a chairperson from among its members who serves as mayor, and another member to serve as deputy mayor. The committee serves as Wyckoff's legislative and executive body, with the mayor responsible for chairing meetings and signing documents on behalf of the township.

, the members of the Wyckoff Township Committee are Mayor Tom Madigan (R, term on committee ends December 31, 2024; term as mayor ends 2023), Rudolf E. Boonstra Jr. (R, 2025), Scott Fisher (R, 2023), Peter J. Melchionne (R, 2023) and Timothy E. Shanley (R, 2024).

Township politics
In December 2022, Melissa Rubenstein resigned from her committee seat expiring in December 2023.

In September 2021, former chairman of the Bergen County Republican Organization Committee Bob Yudin launched a write-in campaign against Republican township committeeman Tom Madigan. Yudin argued that Madigan's role in moving the Wyckoff Board of Education elections from November to April was "a blatant attempt to reduce the voter turnout so Madigan and his minions will have a better chance to put their people into office", and he also attacked Madigan's character by citing a dismissed 2010 complaint that charged him with slapping a 17-year-old. Madigan staved off the challenge, having received 4,014 votes in the November 2021 election versus Yudin's 1,200 write-in votes.

In August 2021 the township committee voted to move Wyckoff Board of Education elections from November to April, claiming that, in part because April elections would allow residents a direct vote on the school budget, the move would increase Board of Education transparency and accountability. The Board President criticized the committee's vote as a "highly political" decision that would "adversely affect the quality of education in Wyckoff", and others cited concerns about lower voter turnout in April elections.

In June 2019, a controversy emerged over whether Wyckoff should fly the gay pride flag at town hall. Mayor Tom Madigan denied calls from residents and local activists, including a petition with over 1000 signatures and a 100-person rally, citing concerns that flying the flag could create a public forum where the town could be forced to recognize any cause. A year later, in June 2020, Mayor Tim Shanley led the township committee in flying the pride flag on a pole near the library on the same municipal lot as town hall; Committeeman Rudy Boonstra abstained from the flag-raising ceremony, and Shanley accused Madigan, now a committeeman, of saying he "wanted no ceremony," and "to strike 'proudly' from the resolution supporting the cause when we passed it this year".

In May 2019, Committeewoman Melissa Rubenstein, who had been elected in 2017 as a Democrat, switched her party affiliation to Republican.

At the January 2018 reorganization meeting, committeeman Brian Scanlan was chosen as Wyckoff's first Democratic mayor; in 2017 he was not chosen as mayor, despite a longstanding committee tradition of having the previous year's deputy mayor, which Scanlan had been, serve as mayor. In 2018 no deputy mayor was selected. Rubenstein, Scanlan's running mate, was also sworn in, becoming the second elected Democrat, second woman, and first Jewish person to serve on the committee.

At the January 2017 reorganization meeting, the committee selected Republican Timothy Shanley to fill the seat expiring in December 2018 that had been held by Kevin J. Rooney until he resigned from office to fill the vacant Assembly seat that had been held by Scott Rumana.

Committee member Kevin J. Rooney won the 2013 version of the Food Network series Chopped, donating his $10,000 winnings to Oasis—A Haven for Women and Children based in Paterson.

Federal, state and county representation
Wyckoff is in the 5th Congressional District and is part of New Jersey's 40th state legislative district.

Electoral history

As of March 2011, there were a total of 11,809 registered voters in Wyckoff Township, of which 2,203 (18.7% vs. 31.7% countywide) were registered as Democrats, 4,504 (38.1% vs. 21.1%) were registered as Republicans and 5,099 (43.2% vs. 47.1%) were registered as Unaffiliated. There were 3 voters registered as Libertarians or Greens. Among the township's 2010 Census population, 70.7% (vs. 57.1% in Bergen County) were registered to vote, including 97.7% of those ages 18 and over (vs. 73.7% countywide).

In the 2020 presidential election, Republican Donald Trump received 5,814 votes (50.7% vs. 41.2% countywide), ahead of Democrat Joe Biden with 5,458 votes (47.6% vs. 57.7% countywide) and other candidates with 198 votes (1.7% vs. 1.1% countywide), among the 11,470 ballots cast by the township's 14,075 registered voters, for a turnout of 81.5% (vs. 75.1% in Bergen County). In the 2016 presidential election, Republican Donald Trump received 5,257 votes (53.8% vs. 41.1% countywide), ahead of Democrat Hillary Clinton with 4,078 votes (41.7% vs. 54.2%) and other candidates with 442 votes (4.5% vs. 4.6%), among the 9,888 ballots cast by the township's 12,937 registered voters, for a turnout of 76.4% (vs. 72.5% in Bergen County). In the 2012 presidential election, Republican Mitt Romney received 5,871 votes (64.0% vs. 43.5% countywide), ahead of Democrat Barack Obama with 3,183 votes (34.7% vs. 54.8%) and other candidates with 68 votes (0.7% vs. 0.9%), among the 9,168 ballots cast by the township's 12,430 registered voters, for a turnout of 73.8% (vs. 70.4% in Bergen County). In the 2008 presidential election, Republican John McCain received 5,851 votes (59.3% vs. 44.5% countywide), ahead of Democrat Barack Obama with 3,903 votes (39.6% vs. 53.9%) and other candidates with 55 votes (0.6% vs. 0.8%), among the 9,860 ballots cast by the township's 12,085 registered voters, for a turnout of 81.6% (vs. 76.8% in Bergen County). In the 2004 presidential election, Republican George W. Bush received 5,990 votes (62.8% vs. 47.2% countywide), ahead of Democrat John Kerry with 3,459 votes (36.3% vs. 51.7%) and other candidates with 63 votes (0.7% vs. 0.7%), among the 9,541 ballots cast by the township's 11,624 registered voters, for a turnout of 82.1% (vs. 76.9% in the whole county).

In the 2013 gubernatorial election, Republican Chris Christie received 75.0% of the vote (3,958 cast), ahead of Democrat Barbara Buono with 24.0% (1,267 votes), and other candidates with 1.0% (52 votes), among the 5,342 ballots cast by the township's 11,974 registered voters (65 ballots were spoiled), for a turnout of 44.6%. In the 2009 gubernatorial election, Republican Chris Christie received 1,905 votes (50.3% vs. 45.8% countywide), ahead of Democrat Jon Corzine with 1,608 votes (42.4% vs. 48.0%), Independent Chris Daggett with 213 votes (5.6% vs. 4.7%) and other candidates with 24 votes (0.6% vs. 0.5%), among the 3,791 ballots cast by the township's 6,975 registered voters, yielding a 54.4% turnout (vs. 50.0% in the county).

Education
The Wyckoff School District serves public students in pre-kindergarten through eighth grade. As of the 2020–21 school year, the district, comprised of five schools, had an enrollment of 1,932 students and 179.2 classroom teachers (on an FTE basis), for a student–teacher ratio of 10.8:1. Schools in the district (with 2020–21 enrollment data from the National Center for Education Statistics) are 
Calvin Coolidge Elementary School, with 289 students in grades K-5, 
Abraham Lincoln Elementary School, with 304 students in grades K-5, 
Sicomac Elementary School, with 297 students in grades PreK-5, 
George Washington Elementary School with 346 students in grades K-5 and 
Dwight D. Eisenhower Middle School, with 672 students in grades 6-8. Calvin Coolidge School, located at 420 Grandview Avenue, is an elementary school which opened in 1932 as a six-room K–6 school and has been expanded several times over the years. Eisenhower Middle School was approved in 1960 and dedicated 1963. Since 1993, Eisenhower has served grades 6 to 8. Abraham Lincoln School was dedicated in 1953 on land purchased in 1950. Sicomac School was completed in 1967. George Washington School was constructed as an 11-room brick building on the site where the previous school had burned down.

In the 2003–2004 school year, Eisenhower Middle School was recognized with the National Blue Ribbon School of Excellence Award from the United States Department of Education, the highest honor that an American school can achieve.

Public high school students from Wyckoff in ninth through twelfth grades attend the schools of the Ramapo Indian Hills Regional High School District, which also serves students from Franklin Lakes and Oakland. Students entering the district as freshmen have the option to attend either of the district's high schools, subject to a choice made during eighth grade. Schools in the district (with 2020–21 enrollment data from the National Center for Education Statistics) are
Indian Hills High School, located in Oakland (919 students) and
Ramapo High School, located in Franklin Lakes (1,285 students). The high school district's nine-member board of education oversees the operation of the district; seats on the board are allocated based on population, with four of the nine seats allocated to Wyckoff.

The first public school building in the township was a one-room schoolhouse constructed on Wyckoff Avenue in 1869 and used until 1906. Prior to 1929, high school students attended Paterson Central High School in Paterson, before the Board of Education voted to send students to Ramsey High School in Ramsey instead. Franklin Lakes, Oakland and Wyckoff (FLOW district) approved the creation of a regional high school in 1954 by a vote of 1,060 to 51, with Ramapo High School (in Franklin Lakes) opened in 1957 and Indian Hills High School in 1960.

Public school students from the township, and all of Bergen County, are eligible to attend the secondary education programs offered by the Bergen County Technical Schools, which include the Bergen County Academies in Hackensack, and the Bergen Tech campus in Teterboro or Paramus. The district offers programs on a shared-time or full-time basis, with admission based on a selective application process and tuition covered by the student's home school district.

Eastern Christian Middle School (ECMS) is a private Christian school with about 200 students in grades 6–8 that is a part of the Eastern Christian School Association.

Saint Elizabeth School serves children grades Pre-K–8, with an average of 30 kids in each grade and operates under the supervision of the Roman Catholic Archdiocese of Newark. The school was recognized in 2011 with the National Blue Ribbon Award of Excellence by the United States Department of Education.

Emergency services

Fire department
Wyckoff has a fire department that was founded in 1907 and consists of three companies.

Ambulance and police departments
Wyckoff has its own volunteer ambulance corps. It was established in 1926 and responded to over 1,000 calls in 2014. Wyckoff Police Department was established in 1922 and operates on a 24-hour basis.

Transportation

Roads and highways

Route 208 heads northwest through the township, entering from Hawthorne in Passaic County and continuing  before entering Franklin Lakes. County Route 502 (Franklin Avenue) enters from Franklin Lakes and runs east–west through the northern portion of the township for  before entering Waldwick.

Public transportation
NJ Transit provides service on the 148 route to the Port Authority Bus Terminal in Midtown Manhattan and local bus service on the 722 route and on the 752 route, which operates between Oakland and Hackensack.

Bus service is also provided by Short Line Bus to the Port Authority Bus Terminal in Midtown Manhattan, with some buses providing service across 42nd Street to Second Avenue.

Historic rail service

The historic Wyckoff railroad station was built by the New Jersey Midland Railway around 1870 and later served passengers on the New York, Susquehanna and Western Railroad (NYS&W). until service was abruptly curtailed in 1966. Plans to restore service have not materialized. The township is a stop on the annual Toys for Tots train.

Local media
Wyckoff is served by the Wyckoff Suburban News, a weekly community newspaper published by the North Jersey Media Group. The daily newspaper for the region is The Record which is also published by North Jersey Media Group.

Houses of worship
Houses of worship in the township include:
Abundant Life Reformed Church
Advent Lutheran Church (Evangelical Lutheran Church in America)
Bergen Christian Testimony Church
Bethany Church (Assemblies of God)
Cedar Hill Christian Reformed Church (Christian Reformed Church in North America), founded in 1990
Cornerstone Christian Church
Faith Community Christian (Christian Reformed Church in North America)
Grace United Methodist Church (United Methodist Church) was established in Paterson in 1868 and relocated to Wyckoff in 1964.
St. Barsawmo Syriac Orthodox Church (Syriac Orthodox Church) was founded in Mahwah in 1998 and relocated to Wyckoff in 2008.
St. Elizabeth of Hungary Roman Catholic Church (Roman Catholic Church)
St. Nicholas Greek Orthodox Church (Greek Orthodox Metropolis of New Jersey) was established in 1970 and opened at its current site in 1973.
Temple Beth Rishon (an "independent, liberal, egalitarian Jewish congregation")
Wyckoff Assembly of God
Wyckoff Reformed Church (Reformed Church in America)

Notable people

People who were born in, residents of, or otherwise closely associated with Wyckoff include: ((B) denotes that the person was born in Wyckoff).

 Tom Acker (1930–2021), former Major League Baseball pitcher who played for the Cincinnati Reds
 Paul Apostol (born 1945), fencer who competed in the individual and team sabre events at the 1972 and 1976 Summer Olympics
 Jillian Armenante (born 1968), actress who played the role of Donna Kozlowski on the TV show Judging Amy
 Theodore J. Bauer (1909–2005), former Assistant Surgeon General of the United States and head of the Centers for Disease Control and Prevention
 Marco Benevento (born 1977), jazz keyboardist and member of Benevento/Russo Duo
 Katrina Bowden (born 1988), actress on 30 Rock(B)
 Kirk DeMicco, screenwriter, director and producer, best known for writing and directing Space Chimps and The Croods
 Bucky Dent (born 1951), New York Yankees player, best known for home run that beat the Boston Red Sox on October 2, 1978, in a one-game tiebreaker to get to the playoffs
 Christopher DePhillips (born 1965), politician who has represented the 40th Legislative District in the New Jersey General Assembly since 2018
 Steve Doocy (born 1956), Fox News anchor on Fox & Friends
 Gertrude Ederle (1905–2003), first woman to swim the English Channel
 William W. Evans Jr. (1921–1999), politician who served as Mayor of Wyckoff and in the New Jersey General Assembly, who was a candidate for the Republican nomination for president in 1968
 Marcel Gleyre (1910–1996), gymnast who competed in the men's vault event at the 1932 Summer Olympics
 Josh Gottheimer (born 1975), U.S. Representative for New Jersey's 5th congressional district, serving since 2017
 Vernon Greene (1908–1965), prolific cartoonist and illustrator who worked on several comic strips and was best known for his artwork on Bringing Up Father
 Amy Grossberg (born 1978), served nearly 37 months in jail for killing her baby with her boyfriend, Brian Peterson
 Morgan Hoffman (born 1989), professional golfer
 Chris Hogan (born 1988), wide receiver who has played in the NFL for the New England Patriots
 Nancy Hower (born 1966), actress, director, screenwriter and producer, who had a recurring role as Ensign Samantha Wildman on the sci-fi series Star Trek: Voyager(B)
 Frankie Jonas (born 2000), actor, younger brother of the Jonas Brothers(B)
 Joe Jonas (born 1989), musician and member of the band Jonas Brothers
 Kevin Jonas (born 1987), musician and member of the band Jonas Brothers
 Nick Jonas (born 1992), musician and member of the band Jonas Brothers
 Dan Karaty (born 1976), television personality, producer, dancer and choreographer who has been a judge on So You Think You Can Dance
 Artie Lewicki (born 1992), MLB pitcher for the Detroit Tigers
 Bruce Lundvall (1935–2015), record company executive, best known for his period as the President and CEO of the Blue Note Label Group, reporting directly to Eric Nicoli, the chief executive officer of EMI Group
 Tor Lundvall (born 1968), painter and musician
 Martha MacCallum (born 1964), news anchor on Fox News Channel(B)
 Constantine Maroulis (born 1975), singer/actor who was a finalist on American Idol season 4 in 2005
 Henry McNamara (1934–2018), member of the New Jersey Senate from 1985 to 2008 who served as Mayor of Wyckoff in 1979
 Sunny Mehta (born 1978), New Jersey Devils Director of Analytics, professional poker player, author, and musician
 Max Middendorf (born 1967), ice hockey center who played in the NHL for the Quebec Nordiques and Edmonton Oilers
 Rob Milanese (born 1980), professional football wide receiver / cornerback who played for the Philadelphia Soul in the Arena Football League
 Ezra Miller (born 1992), actor(B)
 John J. Mooney (1930–2020), chemical engineer who was co-inventor of the three-way catalytic converter
 Marty Munsch (born 1967), professional producer, engineer, musician, photo journalist. Founder and president of Punk Rock Records and Northern Front RecordsRiot On The Dance Floor Film
 Tim Pernetti (born 1970), Chief Business Officer of the Major League Soccer expansion club New York City FC who had been Director of Intercollegiate Athletics at Rutgers University between 2009 and 2013
 Brian Peterson, served two years in jail for killing his baby with his girlfriend, Amy Grossberg
 John R. Ramsey (1862–1933), represented New Jersey's 6th congressional district from 1917 to 1921(B)
 Tara Reid (born 1975), actress(B)
 Kevin J. Rooney (born 1960), politician who has represented the 40th Legislative District in the New Jersey General Assembly since 2016
 Greg Schiano (born 1966), former head coach of the Tampa Bay Buccaneers who was head coach of the Rutgers Scarlet Knights football team from 2001 to 2011(B)
 John A. Spizziri (born 1934), politician who served in the New Jersey General Assembly from 1972 to 1978
 Robert B. Sturges, Florida businessman and former New Jersey government official.
 Melissa Sweet (born 1956), children's book writer and illustrator who is a Sibert Medal winner and two-time Caldecott Medal winner(B)
 Danny Tamberelli (born 1982), actor(B)
 Brian Toal (born 1985), professional football player(B)
 Al Vandeweghe (1920–2014), professional football player for the All-America Football Conference's Buffalo Bisons in 1946(B)
 Stuart Varney (born 1949), economics journalist who has appeared on the Fox News Channel and the Fox Business Network
 George Verwer (born 1938), founder of Operation Mobilisation (OM), a Christian missions organization
 Chris Wragge (born 1970), news anchor on WCBS-TV
 Bob Yudin (born 1939), Chairman of the Bergen County, New Jersey Republican Party, 2008-2016
 Don Zimmer (1931–2014), New York Yankees bench coach and former Boston Red Sox Manager

Historic sites

Wyckoff is home to the following locations on the National Register of Historic Places:

 Cairns-Whitten-Blauvelt House – 160 Ravine Avenue (added 1983), was constructed .
 Cruse-Hossington House – 301 Newtown Road (added 1983), is a Dutch farmhouse that dates back to 1798.
 Folly House – 310 Crescent Avenue (added 1983), is a -story home constructed sometime before 1860.
 Masker House – 470 Wyckoff Avenue (added 1983), was constructed in 1780, with an addition built on to the original structure.
 Reformed Dutch Church of Wyckoff – 580 Wyckoff Avenue (added 2003)
 John C. Stagg House – 308 Sicomac Avenue (added 1983), was built in the second half of the 18th century on a foundation dating to 1747.
 Terhune House – 161 Godwin Avenue (added 1983), dates to the 1700s.
 Van Blarcom - Jardine House – 380 Wyckoff Avenue (added 1983)
 Van Blarcom House (Wyckoff, New Jersey) – 131 Godwin Avenue (added 1983).
 Albert Van Blarcom House – 250 Crescent Avenue (added 1983) dates back to the 1700s, with the main portion of the current house constructed around 1830.
 Van Gelder House – 347 Godwin Avenue (added 1983)
 Van Horn-Ackerman House – 101 Wyckoff Avenue (added 1983), consists of an original structure dating back to 1750, with successively larger additions tacked on to the house over the years.
 Van Houten-Ackerman House (Wyckoff, New Jersey) – 480 Sicomac Avenue (added 1983), known by the name "Wellsweep", the original portion of the home dates back to the 1700s.
 Van Voorhees-Quackenbush House – 421 Franklin Avenue (added 1983). Dating to an original structure built , the house is believed to be the oldest in the township and was contributed to the township in 1973 following the death of Grace Quackenbush Zabriskie.
 Van Voorhis-Quackenbush House – 625 Wyckoff Avenue (added 1984)

References

Sources
 Municipal Incorporations of the State of New Jersey (according to Counties) prepared by the Division of Local Government, Department of the Treasury (New Jersey); December 1, 1958.
 Brown, David R.; and the Wyckoff Historical Society Images of America: Wyckoff, Arcadia Publishing, 2002. .
 Clayton, W. Woodford; and Nelson, William. History of Bergen and Passaic Counties, New Jersey, with Biographical Sketches of Many of its Pioneers and Prominent Men., Philadelphia: Everts and Peck, 1882.
 Harvey, Cornelius Burnham (ed.), Genealogical History of Hudson and Bergen Counties, New Jersey. New York: New Jersey Genealogical Publishing Co., 1900.
 Van Dusen, Matthew. "Losing the Space Race", The Record, September 14, 2006.
 Van Valen, James M. History of Bergen County, New Jersey. New York: New Jersey Publishing and Engraving Co., 1900.
 Westervelt, Frances A. (Frances Augusta), 1858–1942, History of Bergen County, New Jersey, 1630–1923, Lewis Historical Publishing Company, 1923.
 On High Ground: A History of the Township of Wyckoff, New Jersey, Donning Company Publishers, 2000. .

External links

 Wyckoff official website

 
1926 establishments in New Jersey
Populated places established in 1926
Township form of New Jersey government
Townships in Bergen County, New Jersey